Oh Laura, formerly known as Laura, is a Swedish Indie-pop band from Stockholm consisting of Frida Öhrn on vocals, Jocke Olovsson and Jörgen Kjellgren on guitars, Rikard Lidhamn on bass and Magnus Olsson on drums. The band's debut record, A Song Inside My Head, a Demon in My Bed, was released on May 25, 2007 under the independent label Cosmos Records. The first single off the record is "Release Me" and has appeared in a Saab commercial aired in Sweden, Norway, Poland, Spain, New Zealand, Australia, Ireland, France and the United Kingdom. "Release Me", peaked at #5 on Swedish music charts. Oh Laura won Grand Prix at International Sopot Festival on August 23, 2008 in Sopot, Poland The single Release Me was certified platinum by the Swedish IFPI in 2007.

Band members 
Frida Öhrn – vocals
Jocke Olovsson – guitar 
Jörgen Kjellgren – guitar 
Rikard Lidhamn – bass guitar
Magnus Olsson – drums

Discography

Albums 
 A Song Inside My Head, a Demon in My Bed (2007)
 The Mess We Left Behind (2012)

Singles 
 "Release Me" (2007)
 "It Ain't Enough" (2007)

References

2004 establishments in Sweden
Musical groups established in 2004
Swedish country music groups
Swedish musical groups
English-language singers from Sweden